Baptist Noel, 3rd Viscount Campden (1611 – 29 October 1682) was an English politician. He was Lord Lieutenant of Rutland, Custos Rotulorum of Rutland and the Member of Parliament for Rutland.

Early life
Baptist Noel was born at Exton Hall, Rutland the son of Edward Noel, 2nd Viscount Campden and the former Hon. Juliana Hicks. His younger brother, Hon. Henry Noel, married Mary Perry. His sister, Hon. Elizabeth Noel, was the wife of John Chaworth, 2nd Viscount Chaworth, and other sister, Hon. Mary Noel, was the wife of Sir Erasmus de la Fontaine, of Kirby Ballers.

His father was the eldest son and heir of Sir Andrew Noel and Mabel Harington (sister of John Harington, 1st Baron Harington). His mother was the eldest daughter and co-heiress of Baptist Hicks, 1st Viscount Campden and Elizabeth May, sister of Sir Humphrey May, Master of the Rolls, children of Richard May, a merchant tailor of London.

Career
In 1640, he was returned alongside Sir Guy Palmes as a Member of Parliament for Rutland after Parliament had been suspended since 1629.

Noel succeeded to his titles on the death of his father in 1643 and was required to leave the House of Commons. He was also Baron Noel of Ridlington and Baron Hicks of Ilmington. He was elected as a knight of the shire for Rutland in the Long Parliament of 1640.

During the Civil War he was a military commander, rising to the level of brigadier-general. A supporter of King Charles, he was fined £9,000 for delinquency and Campden House, his house at Campden was destroyed.

Personal life

Noel was married four times. His first marriage was on 25 December 1632 to Lady Anne Feilding, a daughter of William Feilding, 1st Earl of Denbigh. Before her death on 24 March 1656, they had three children, all of whom died young.

Ann, the widow of Edward Bourchier, 4th Earl of Bath, was a daughter of Sir Robert Lovett of Liscombe, Buckinghamshire. She died in 1639.

He married thirdly on 21 December 1639 to Hester Wotton, a daughter of Thomas Wotton, 2nd Baron Wotton.

 Hon. Mary Noel (d. 1719), who married, as his second wife, James Compton, 3rd Earl of Northampton, before 1664.
 Hon. Juliana Noel (1645–1667), who married, as his second wife, William Alington, 3rd Baron Alington, in 1664.
 Hon. Elizabeth Noel (d. 1719), who married Charles Berkeley, 2nd Earl of Berkeley, in 1677.
 Edward Noel, 1st Earl of Gainsborough
 Henry Noel, who married Elizabeth Wale, third daughter and co-heiress of Sir William Wale, Alderman of London.

His fourth, and final, marriage was on 6 July 1655 to Lady Elizabeth Bertie (1640–1683), daughter of Montagu Bertie, 2nd Earl of Lindsey. Together, they were the parents of nine children, including:

 Baptist Noel (1658–1690), who married Susannah Fanshawe, daughter and heiress of Sir Thomas Fanshawe, of Jenkins in Barking, in 1662.
 Hon. John Noel (d. 1718), who married Hon. Elizabeth Ingram, widow of Edward Ingram, 2nd Viscount Irvine, sister of Bennet Sherard, 1st Earl of Harborough, and eldest daughter of Bennet Sherard, 2nd Baron Sherard, in 1696.
 Hon. Catherine Noel (1657–1723/4), who married, as his third wife, John Manners, 1st Duke of Rutland.
 Hon. Martha Penelope Noel, who married Dormer.

Lord Campden died on 29 October 1682 and was buried in the church of St Peter and St Paul, Exton. His grave is marked by a fine marble tomb by Grinling Gibbons, dating from 1685, showing the Viscount with his fourth wife, Lady Elizabeth Bertie, and carvings of his nineteen children. He was succeeded by his eldest surviving son, Edward Noel, 1st Earl of Gainsborough.

References

 

|-

|-

1611 births
1682 deaths
Lord-Lieutenants of Rutland
Baptist
English MPs 1640–1648
People from Rutland
Viscounts Campden